Religions in Karachi include Islam, Christianity, Hinduism, Sikhism, Buddhism, Zoroastrianism and others. According to a 1998 census of Pakistan, the religious breakdown of the city is as follows: Muslim (96.45%), Christian (2.42%), Hindu (0.86%), Ahmadis (0.17%) and other (0.10%). Other religious groups include Parsis, Sikhs, Baháʼí, Jews and Buddhists. Of the Muslims, approximately 66% are Sunnis and 34% are Shi'ites. The Sunnis follow Hanafi fiqh while Shi'ites are predominantly Ithnā‘Ashariyyah fiqh, with significant minority groups who follow Ismaili Fiqh, which is composed of Nizari (Aga Khanis), Mustaali, Dawoodi Bohra and Sulaymani fiqhs.

History

Early 
In ancient times Karanchi and entire Sindh was Hindu. With the advent of muslim invasion hindu exodus began with mass killings of hindus and forcible conversions to islam. Till by the end of 16the century Karachi was a small fishing village of Sindhi and Balochi people when Hindu merchants from Thatta established a trading port there in the early 18th century. When the British seized control of the offshore, strategically located island of Manora in 1839, Karachi had about 10,000 inhabitants, predominantly Muslim. Thereafter, authorities of the British Raj embarked on a large-scale modernisation of the city in the 19th century with the intention of establishing a major and modern port which could serve as a gateway to Punjab, the western parts of British India, and Afghanistan.

Britain's competition with imperial Russia during the Great Game also heightened the need for a modern port near Central Asia, and so Karachi prospered as a major centre of commerce and industry during the Raj, attracting communities of: Africans, Arabs, Armenians, Catholics from Goa, Jewish, Lebanese, Malays, Konkani people from Maharashtra, Kuchhi from Kuchh, Gujarat in India, and Zoroastrians (also known as Parsees) - in addition to the large number of British businessmen and colonial administrators who established the city's poshest locales, such as Clifton.

As a result, this mass migration changed the religious and cultural mosaic of Karachi; 104 years of British rule changed the demographic profile of Karachi from a collection of small predominantly Muslim fishing villages to a multicultural city.

1947 Partition 
At the time of independence, the population of the city of Karachi was 51.1% Hindu, 42.3% Muslim, with the remaining 7% primarily Christians (both British and native), Sikhs, Jains, with a small number of Jews.

The independence of Pakistan in 1947 saw an influx of Muslim refugees from India fleeing to settle. While the hindus staying in Karanchi since prehistoric times were persecuted and killed. Ultimately most of the hindu population migrated to India to save their faith. Many of the Urdu-speaking and other non-Punjabi Muslim refugees that fled from various states of India settled in Karachi, giving the city a blend of predominantly Muslim culture.

Islam 

The state religion in Pakistan is Islam, which is practiced by about 96-98% of the 195,343,000 people of the nation. The remaining 2-4% practice Hinduism, Christianity, Ahmadiyya, Sikhism, Buddhism, Baháʼí and other religions. Muslims are divided into two major sects: the majority of them practice Sunni Islam, while the Shias comprise an estimated 10-15%. Nearly all Pakistani Sunni Muslims belong to the Hanafi Fiqh Islamic law school. The majority of Pakistani Shia Muslims belong to the Ithnā‘Ashariyyah Islamic law school, with significant minority groups who practice Ismailism, which is composed of Nizari (Aga Khanis), Mustaali, Dawoodi Bohra, Sulaymani, and others.

Hinduism 

Most Hindus and Sikhs of Karachi migrated to India during the 1947 partition and from 1948 onwards - after the establishment of Pakistan. Poor Hindus of Marwari and Rajasthani descent are concentrated particularly in Naraianpura and Lyari, while wealthier Sindhi Hindus live in Clifton and Saddar.

Prominent temples include the Sri Swami Narayan temple on MA Jinnah Road, Daryalal Temple in Kharadar, and numerous temples in Narainpura including a Gujarati temple, a Marwari Temple, and a temple for the Karachi Sikh Sangat. Soldier Bazaar is home to a functioning Shri Panchmukhi Hanuman Temple, and Ganesh temple.

Two temples function in Clifton: the Samadha Dham and Sri Ratneshwar Mahadev Temple. In Civil Lines, the Sant Satram Dham functions on School Road near Karachi Cantonment Station.

A property currently in dispute between Sikhs and Hindus also stands in Aram Bagh (formerly Ram Bagh), although the areas Ram Talao no longer exists, and Ramchandra temple no longer exists. Mithadar is home to the Bhagnari Shiv Temple and Devi Mata Temple. Manora is home to the Sri Varun Dev Temple.

As of the 1998 census, some 250,000 Hindus remain in Karachi, forming approximately 0.86% of the total city population. However, despite most Hindus having left Karachi, a large number of streets continue to bear Hindu names, particularly in Aram Bagh, Mithadar, and Ramswamy.

Christianity 

The largest religious minority in Karachi are the Christians. The two major Christian ethnic groups are Goan Catholics and Punjabi Christians. The Punjabi Christians are converts from the Hindu Churas caste to Christianity during the British raj.

See also
 Demographics of Karachi
 Culture of Karachi
 Islam in Karachi
 Roman Catholic Archdiocese of Karachi

References

Further reading
  The Political Ethnicity and the State of Pakistan
"DHA wants SHC to shut down temple built on residential plot", The Express Tribune, 12 June 2014